Coupland can refer to:

Places
Coupland, Cumbria, England. Traditionally located in Westmorland
Coupland, Northumberland, England
Coupland Castle
Coupland, Texas, United States

Other uses
Coupland (surname)